Enotes is a genus of longhorn beetles of the subfamily Lamiinae, containing the following species:

 Enotes lifuanus (Montrouzier, 1861)
 Enotes montrouzieri Thomson, 1864

References

Enicodini